Giambattista Spinola Jr. (1646–1719) was the nephew of Giambattista Spinola (seniore) and like his uncle a Cardinal of the Roman Catholic Church.

At various times he served as a papal legate in such places as Bologna.

References

Sources
short bios of Cardinals

1646 births
1719 deaths
Cardinal-nephews